The 2015 All-Big 12 Conference football team consists of American football players chosen as All-Big 12 Conference players for the 2015 Big 12 Conference football season.  The conference recognizes two official All-Big 12 selectors: (1) the Big 12 conference coaches selected separate offensive and defensive units and named first- and second-team players (the "Coaches" team); and (2) a panel of sports writers and broadcasters covering the Big 12 also selected offensive and defensive units and named first- and second-team players (the "Media" team).

Offensive selections

Quarterbacks
 Baker Mayfield, Oklahoma (Coaches-1; Media-1)
 Trevone Boykin, TCU (Coaches-2; Media-2)

Running backs
 Samaje Perine, Oklahoma (Coaches-1; Media-1)
 DeAndré Washington, Texas Tech (Coaches-1; Media-1)
 Shock Linwood, Baylor (Coaches-2; Media-2)
 Wendell Smallwood, West Virginia (Coaches-2; Media-2)

Fullbacks
 Winston Dimel, Kansas State (Coaches-1)
 Alex De La Torre, Texas (Coaches-2)

Centers
 Joey Hunt, TCU (Coaches-1; Media-1)
 Ty Darlington, Oklahoma (Coaches-1; Media-2)
 Kyle Fuller, Baylor (Coaches-2; Media-2)
 Tyler Orlosky, West Virginia (Coaches-2)

Guards
 Nila Kasitati, Oklahoma (Coaches-1; Media-1)
 Cody Whitehair, Kansas State (Coaches-1; Media-2)
 Jarell Broxton, Baylor (Coaches-2; Media-1)
 Jamison Lalk, Iowa State (Coaches-2)
 Brady Foltz, TCU (Media-2)
 Alfredo Morales, Texas Tech (Media-2)

Tackles
 Le'Raven Clark, Texas Tech (Coaches-1; Media-1)
 Spencer Drango, Baylor (Coaches-1; Media-1)
 Halapoulivaati Vaitai, TCU (Coaches-2; Media-2)

Tight ends
 Mark Andrews, Oklahoma (Coaches-2; Media-1)
 Blake Jarwin, Oklahoma State (Coaches-1)
 Glenn Gronkowski, Kansas State (Media-2)

Receivers
 Corey Coleman, Baylor (Coaches-1; Media-1)
 Josh Doctson, TCU (Coaches-1; Media-1)
 Sterling Shepard, Oklahoma (Coaches-1; Media-2)
 James Washington, Oklahoma State (Coaches-2; Media-2)
 K. D. Cannon, Baylor (Coaches-2)
 Jakeem Grant, Texas Tech (Coaches-2)

Defensive selections

Defensive linemen
 Emmanuel Ogbah, Oklahoma State (Coaches-1; Media-1)
 Charles Tapper, Oklahoma (Coaches-1; Media-1)
 Andrew Billings, Baylor (Coaches-1; Media-1)
 Josh Carraway, TCU (Coaches-1; Media-2)
 Will Geary, Kansas State (Media-1)
 Davion Pierson, TCU (Coaches-1)
 Noble Nwachukwu, West Virginia (Media-2)
 Kyle Rose, West Virginia (Media-2)
 Desmond Tucker, Iowa State (Media-2)
 Shawn Oakman, Baylor (Coaches-2)
 Dale Pierson, Iowa State (Coaches-2)
 Travis Britz, Kansas State (Coaches-2)
 Charles Walker, Oklahoma (Coaches-2)
 Jimmy Bean, Oklahoma State (Coaches-2)

Linebackers
 Jordan Burton, Oklahoma State (Media-1)
 Peter Jinkens, Texas (Media-1)
 Eric Striker, Oklahoma (Coaches-1; Media-1)
 Dominique Alexander, Oklahoma (Coaches-1; Media-2)
 Micah Awe, Texas Tech (Media-2)
 Nick Kwiatkoski, West Virginia (Coaches-1; Media-2)
 Peter Jinkens, Texas (Coaches-2)
 Elijah Lee, Kansas State (Coaches-2)
 Jordan Evans, Oklahoma (Coaches-2)

Defensive backs
 Xavien Howard, Baylor (Coaches-1; Media-1)
 Zack Sanchez, Oklahoma (Coaches-1; Media-1)
 Derrick Kindred, TCU (Coaches-1; Media-1)
 Kevin Peterson, Oklahoma State (Coaches-1)
 Jordan Sterns, Oklahoma State (Coaches-2; Media-1)
 Jordan Thomas, Oklahoma (Coaches-2; Media-2)
 Fish Smithson, Kansas (Coaches-2; Media-2)
 Daryl Worley, West Virginia (Media-2)
 Steven Parker, Oklahoma (Media-2)
 Ahmad Thomas, Oklahoma (Coaches-2)

Special teams

Kickers
 Jaden Oberkrom, TCU (Media-1; Coaches-2)
 Jack Cantele, Kansas State (Coaches-1)
 Austin Seibert, Oklahoma (Media-2)

Punters
 Nick O'Toole, West Virginia (Coaches-1; Media-1)
 Austin Seibert, Oklahoma (Coaches-2; Media-2)

All-purpose / Return specialists
 Morgan Burns, Kansas State (Coaches-1; Media-2)
 Jakeem Grant, Texas Tech (Coaches-2; Media-1)

Key
Bold = selected as a first-team player by both the coaches and media panel

Coaches = selected by Big 12 Conference coaches

Media = selected by a media panel

See also
2015 College Football All-America Team

References

All-Big 12 Conference
All-Big 12 Conference football teams